This is a list of shipwrecks located off the coast of England.

1803 under entry for Jan, unknown date, L’Amazon,  Dartmouth Museum holds an original pen and wash sketch. On the reverse is a full account of the ship’s circumstances, ownership and losses.

East

Essex

Norfolk

Suffolk

East Midlands

Leicestershire

North East

County Durham

Northumberland

Tyne and Wear

North West

Lancashire

Merseyside

South East

East Sussex

Hampshire

Isle of Wight

Kent

Goodwin Sands

River Thames

Sussex

South West

Bristol Channel

Cornwall

Devon

Dorset

Isles of Scilly

Yorkshire and the Humber

References

External links

England

Shipwrecks
Shipwrecks, England